Ibuoro is an Ibibio-Efik language of Nigeria. Its dialects are Ibuoro proper, Ito, Itu Mbon Uzo and Nkari.

References

Ibibio-Efik languages
Languages of Nigeria